Nathaniel Gordon (February 6, 1826 – February 21, 1862) was an American slave trader who was the only person in the United States to be tried, convicted and executed for having "engaged in the slave trade" under the Piracy Law of 1820.

Early life
Gordon was born in Portland, Maine. He went into shipping and eventually owned his own ship. He had a wife named Elizabeth and a two-year-old son named Nathaniel at the time of his final voyage to Africa.

When Gordon was 12, his father was arrested for attempting to smuggle slaves into the United States. The law stated that he should be deemed a pirate and given a mandatory death sentence. However, there are no records of how the case was resolved, albeit it is known that Gordon's father was not executed.

Slave trading
In 1848, Gordon's boat, Juliet, was searched by the U.S. Navy for evidence of slave trading. After no evidence of slave trading could be found, Gordon was released from their custody. However, there were allegations that Gordon had indeed gone to Africa, taken a cargo of slaves, and returned to Brazil, where slavery was still legal at the time.

In 1851, Gordon, captaining the Camargo, went on another expedition from Brazil to Africa. Gordon took on 500 Africans and set sail for Brazil. He had to take numerous measures to avoid naval patrol ships. Gordon was nevertheless chased by a British man-of-war. After arriving in Brazil and dropping off the Africans, Gordon burned his ship to destroy evidence. The Africans were seized and some of Gordon's men were arrested and charged. Gordon himself escaped by dressing into women's clothes.

Shortly after the Camargo voyage, Gordon, captaining Ottawa, made a slaving voyage to Cuba, where slavery was also still legal, with a cargo of Africans. Only about 25 percent of the Africans survived, with Gordon later claiming that a rival trader had poisoned them. After landing in Cuba, Gordon burned his ship afterwards to destroy evidence.

In late July 1860, Gordon set sail for the west coast of Africa. On August 7, 1860, he loaded 897 slaves aboard Erie at Sharks Point, Congo River, West Africa, "of whom only 172 were men and 162 grown women. Gordon ... preferred to carry children because they could not rise up to avenge his cruelties." According to reports, Gordon was responsible for at least 29 deaths. Those who died were thrown overboard.

Erie was captured by the USS Mohican 50 miles from a Cuban port on August 8, 1860. The slaves were taken to Liberia, the American colony established in West Africa by the American Colonization Society for the settlement of free blacks from the United States. Gordon was extradited to New York to face a federal trial.

Trials

The United States Attorney for the Southern District of New York, James I. Roosevelt, offered Gordon a $2,000 fine and two-year sentence in exchange for information about his financial backers. However, Gordon, confident that he wouldn't face any severe consequences, rejected the deal, believing it was not lenient enough.

The case was repeatedly delayed due to the onset of the Civil War. By the time of Gordon's trial, a new district attorney, Edward Delafield Smith, had been appointed. Smith saw the Gordon case as a chance to become prominent and an opportunity to set an example for all future slave traders. He wanted Gordon executed.

Gordon's first trial in New York City in June 1861 ended in a mistrial, with the jury voting 7-5 in favor of a conviction, allegedly due to bribes. Smith immediately pushed for a retrial. To counter potential tampering and bribes, the government had the jury sequestered. Among the arguments used by Gordon's lawyers during his second trial were technicalities which had successfully been exploited in other trials:

 The federal government did not have the authority to try Gordon, on the grounds that Erie was not an American ship since it had been sold to foreigners.
 Gordon himself may not be an American, since his mother sometimes accompanied his father on his voyages, which meant he might've been born at sea.
 Gordon had sailed so far into the Congo that he was in Portuguese waters, and thus not under the jurisdiction of the federal government.
 Gordon was just a passenger, and ceased to be the captain of the Erie after two Spaniards came aboard.

The first three arguments were dismissed by the judge, while the fourth argument was contradicted by witnesses testimony. On November 9, 1861, Gordon was found guilty of piracy by engaging in the slave trade. The prosecution was led by Assistant United States District Attorney George Pierce Andrews. Gordon received the death sentence mandated under the law, with the execution date set for February 7, 1862.
 In passing sentence, Judge W.D. Shipman, in the course of his address to the prisoner, said:

You are soon to be confronted with the terrible consequences of your crime, and it is proper that I should call to your mind the duty of preparing for that event which will soon terminate your mortal existence, and usher you into the presence of the Supreme Judge. 

Let me implore you to seek the spiritual guidance of the ministers of religion; and let your repentance be as humble and thorough as your crime was great.  Do not attempt to hide its enormity from yourself; think of the cruelty and wickedness of seizing nearly a thousand fellow beings, who never did you harm, and thrusting them beneath the decks of a small ship, beneath a burning tropical sun, to die in of disease or suffocation, or be transported to distant lands, and be consigned, they and their posterity, to a fate far more cruel than death.

Think of the sufferings of the unhappy beings whom you crowded on the Erie; of their helpless agony and terror as you took them from their native land; and especially of their miseries on the place of your capture to Monrovia!  Remember that you showed mercy to none, carrying off as you did not only those of your own sex, but women and helpless children.

Do not flatter yourself that because they belonged to a different race from yourself, your guilt is therefore lessened – rather fear that it is increased.  In the just and generous heart, the humble and the weak inspire compassion, and call for pity and forbearance.  As you are soon to pass into the presence of that God of the black man as well as the white man, who is no respecter of persons, do not indulge for a moment the thought that he hears with indifference the cry of the humblest of his children.  Do not imagine that because others shared in the guilt of this enterprise, yours, is thereby diminished; but remember the awful admonition of your Bible, "Though hand joined in hand, the wicked shall not go unpunished."|Worcester Aegis and Transcript; December 7, 1861; pg. 1, col. 6.

Appeals for pardon and execution
After Gordon's conviction, his supporters appealed to President Abraham Lincoln for a pardon. While Lincoln was well known among his contemporaries for his compassion and for issuing many pardons during his presidency, he refused to consider one for Gordon, even going so far as to refuse to meet with Gordon's supporters. Lincoln said at the time, "I believe I am kindly enough in nature, and can be moved to pity and to pardon the perpetrator of almost the worst crime that the mind of man can conceive or the arm of man can execute; but any man, who, for paltry gain and stimulated only by avarice, can rob Africa of her children to sell into interminable bondage, I never will pardon."

On the question of a commutation, Lincoln wrote that "I think I would personally prefer to let this man live in confinement and let him meditate on his deeds, yet in the name of justice and the majesty of law, there ought to be one case, at least one specific instance, of a professional slave-trader, a Northern white man, given the exact penalty of death because of the incalculable number of deaths he and his kind inflicted upon black men amid the horror of the sea-voyage from Africa." Lincoln did give him a two-week stay of execution to "[make] the necessary preparation for the awful change which awaits him",  setting the new execution date for February 21, 1862, on the grounds that Gordon had been misled into thinking he would not be executed.

Early the morning before the execution, Gordon unsuccessfully attempted suicide with strychnine poison. Three doctors worked four hours to keep him alive by pumping his stomach, catheterizing him, and force-feeding him brandy and whiskey. After regaining consciousness, he cried out "I've cheated you! I've cheated you!" Gordon then begged the doctors assist his suicide, saying he would rather die alone than suffer the humiliation of being publicly executed. He was sufficiently revived to make a speech before approaching the gallows, in which he asked his friends to take care of his wife and child and falsely claimed the prosecutor had misled him into believing he would be spared. His last words, spoken to his executioner, were: "Make short work of it now, Bill. I'm ready."

References

Citations

Sources

Further reading
 Hugh Thomas, The Slave Trade: The Story of the Atlantic Slave Trade: 1440-1870. New York: Simon and Schuster, 1997
 Annual reports and charter, constitution, by-laws, names of officers, committees, members, etc., etc. googlebooks Retrieved September 12, 2009

External links
 , Worcester Aegis and Transcript, December 7, 1861, p 1. (From Letters of the Civil War (website).)
 The American slave-trade: an account of its origin, growth and suppression, account of the voyages and trial

1826 births
1862 deaths
19th-century executions by the United States
19th-century executions of American people
American pirates
American mass murderers
American murderers of children
American slave traders
People executed for piracy
People executed by the United States federal government by hanging
Businesspeople from Portland, Maine
Executed people from Maine
Post-1808 importation of slaves to the United States
19th-century pirates
Executed mass murderers